Valerio Olgiati (born 1958) is a Swiss architect. He initially studied architecture at ETH Zurich, a public research university in Zurich, Switzerland, after which he lived in Switzerland, followed by Los Angeles in the United States.

He made a name for himself with the School Building in Paspels in 1998 and the Yellow House Museum in Flims in 1999. Other recognized buildings by him are the House for the Musician/Atelier Bardill in Scharans, the Villa Além in Alentejo, the UNESCO World Heritage Bahrain Pearling Trail Visiting Center in Muharraq, and the Baloise Insurance Building in Basel.

Architectural theory 

Olgiati calls his work "non-referential architecture", the title of a 2018 treatise by Olgiati and architectural theoretician Markus Breitschmid about the social purpose of architecture for the people of the 21st century.

Olgiati and Breitschmid write that "non-referential architecture is not an architecture that subsists as a referential vessel or as a symbol of something outside itself. Non-referential buildings are entities that are themselves meaningful and sense-making and, as such, no less the embodiment of society than buildings were in the past when they were the bearers of common social ideals."

The first documented use of the term "non-referential" in architecture appears in a reprint of an interview between Olgiati and Breitschmid in the Italian architecture journal Domus. In 2014, Breitschmid publishes a rebuttal titled "Architektur leitet sich von Architektur ab" (Architecture is Derived from Architecture) in the Swiss journal Werk, Bauen + Wohnen, thereby responding to an architectural claim made by others that attempts to imbue meaning into architecture from the extra-architectural, such as the economic, ecological, political. Architect Christian Kerez investigated the limits of referentiality and speaks of "non-referential space" as a quality of his contribution for the Venice Biennale of Architecture in 2016. In the same year, architect Peter Eisenman points out that architecture has been moving toward a non-referential objectivity for some time, in as much as architectural form is increasingly reduced “to a pure reality.”

In 2018, Olgiati and Breitschmid published the architectural treatise Non-Referential Architecture. It analyses the societal currents of the early 21st century and argues that those currents are radically different from the epoch of postmodernity. The book proposes a new framework for architecture and defines the seven underlying principles for non-referential architecture: 1) experience of space; 2) oneness; 3) newness; 4) construction; 5) contradiction; 6) order; 7) sensemaking.

One of the hallmarks of non-referential architecture, according to Olgiati, is that each building exists for itself. Each building is governed by an architectural idea – and that idea has to be form-generative and sense-making. "Non-referential architecture denotes but it refuses to explain or narrate and it leaves behind any vestiges of a theatrical mode of persuasion and propagation." Describing the intent of the exhibition ‘Inscriptions: Architecture before Speech’, held at Harvard University’s Graduate School of Design in 2018, K. Michael Hays argues that today’s architecture presupposes “not a particular meaning, but a specific kind of potentiality — a non-semantic materiality, a non-referential construct that can be developed into an actual architectural project.”

Career 
Olgiati mentioned that the most important step for his formation as an architect was his temporary emigration to Los Angeles, and not his upbringing in a specific culture, country, or landscape nor was it his architectural education. According to Olgiati, living in the radically heterogeneous United States of America allowed him to begin to understand the world in formal and natural terms and not in symbolic and historical terms.

This shift away from basing architecture on any kind of referentiality found its early theoretical form in his Iconographic Autobiography, first published in 2006. The Iconographic Autobiography is an anthology of 55 illustrations with which Olgiati demonstrated how he understands architectural conditions formally and not by means of any particular and temporal content, for example symbolic or historical references, which these illustrations also contain. The Iconographic Autobiography foreshadows non-referential architecture in as much as it points to references yet these references are not used anymore as carrying a meaning with which people would understand an architectural work. Olgiati has said that he believes that only basic insight from the experience of space is able to move architecture of the present time within its highly heterogeneous society.

Valerio Olgiati operates his architecture office with his wife Tamara and his staff in Portugal and Switzerland. Among other venues, his work has been the subject of single exhibitions at the National Museum of Modern Art in Tokyo, at the Royal Institute of British Architects in London, and at the Former Colegio de San Ildefonso in Mexico City. Olgiati has held various teaching appointments, among them the Kenzo Tange Chair at Harvard University, at ETH Zürich, at Cornell University and at the AA in London. Olgiati holds a professorship at the Accademia di Architettura in Mendrisio since 2002.

References

Monographs 
 Valerio Olgiati. a+u, No.601, Tokyo, 10/2020 
 Arquitectura No-Referencial. Ideado por Valerio Olgiati; Escrito por Markus Breitschmid. Ciudad de México: Arquine 2020 
 Architettura Non-Referenziale. Ideato da Valerio Olgiati; Scritto da Markus Breitschmid. Zurich: Park Books 2019 
 Nicht-Referenzielle Architektur. Gedacht von Valerio Olgiati; Geschrieben von Markus Breitschmid. 2. Auflage, Zürich: Park Books 2019 
 Non-Referential Architecture. Ideated by Valerio Olgiati; Written by Markus Breitschmid. 2nd edition, Zurich: Park Books 2019 
 Nicht-Referenzielle Architektur. Gedacht von Valerio Olgiati; Geschrieben von Markus Breitschmid. Basel: Simonett & Baer 2018 
 Non-Referential Architecture. Ideated by Valerio Olgiati; Written by Markus Breitschmid. Basel: Simonett & Baer 2018 
 Valerio Olgiati. Projekte 2009-2017. Basel: Simonett & Baer 2017 
 Valerio Olgiati, The Idea of Architecture, Ciudad de México, Arquine 2018
 The Images of Architects, Editor Valerio Olgiati, Quart Verlag GmbH, Luzern 2013, 
 World Architecture, VALERIO OLGIATI - Hello China, Beijing, Nr. 266, 2012, 
 A Lecture by Valerio Olgiati, Birkhäuser Verlag Basel, Switzerland 2011; English: ; German: ; Spanish: ; French: ; Italian: ; ヴァレリオ ・ オルジャティ 講演録, 108 pages
 Valerio Olgiati at the Museum / ヴァレリオ・オルジャティ展, Editor Hosaka Kenjiro, National Museum of Modern Art, Tokyo, Japan 2011–2012; Japanese and English: , 40 pages
 Valerio Olgiati, Parliament Entrance Chur, editor Grisons Building Department, Switzerland 2011; German: ; English: ; Italian: ; Romansh: , 24 pages
 Valerio Olgiati, Weber Auditorium Plantahof, editor Grisons Building Department, Switzerland 2011; German: ; English: , 24 pages
 Dado, Built and Inhabited by Rudolf Olgiati and Valerio Olgiati, Birkhäuser Verlag, Basel, 2010; English: , German: , 100 pages
 Valerio Olgiati, edited by Laurent Stalder, Texts by Mario Carpo, Bruno Reichlin and Laurent Stalder, Verlag der Buchhandlung Walther König, Köln 2008 (1st Edition) / Quart Verlag, Luzern 2010 (2nd edition);  German: , English: , 192 pages
 The Significance of the Idea in the Architecture of Valerio Olgiati, Text in German and English by Markus Breitschmid, Verlag Niggli AG, Switzerland 2008, 80 pages
 Valerio Olgiati, Scharans - House for a Musician, Edition Dino Simonett, Zurich 2007, 64 pages
 Valerio Olgiati, Conversation with Students, Edited by Markus Breitschmid, Virginia Tech Architecture Publications, USA, 2007, 63 pages
 2G, Valerio Olgiati, Gustavo Gili Barcelona, n.37, 2006, 143 pages
 Valerio Olgiati, PLAN 1:100, Edition Dino Simonett, 2004, 64 pages
 Valerio Olgiati, Das Gelbe Haus, Kunsthaus Bregenz, archiv kunst architektur, Werkdokumente 19, 2000, Verlag Gerd Hatje, 82 pages
 14 Studentenprojekte bei Valerio Olgiati 1998 - 2000, Quart Verlag, 2000, 66 pages
 VALERIO OLGIATI, Das Gelbe Haus, Publikation zur Ausstellung an der ETH Zürich 28. Mai - 15. Juli 1999, gta Verlag, ETH Zürich, 18 pages
 Valerio Olgiati, PASPELS, Edition Dino Simonett, 1998, 65 pages

External links

 website
 Valerio Olgiati at archinform
 Valerio Olgiati at nextroom

Living people
1958 births
Swiss architects
Academic staff of the University of Lugano
People from Chur